Chiryawala is a village and union council in Kharian Tehsil, Gujrat District of Punjab, Pakistan. It is located 45 km from Gujrat city and is situated near the town of Kotla Arab Ali Khan. It is the last village within the boundary of Pakistan. It was founded by a person named Chiryo who was a member of the Awana clan (a gotra lineage of the Gurjar people). A vast majority of the people living in this village are Gurjar tribespeople.

Populated places in Gujrat District
Villages in Pakistan